Kruge is the surname of the following people:

Otilie Kruge (later Christensen), Norwegian manager (1865-8) of Framnæs shipyard
Klaus von Storch Kruge (born 1962), Chilean aerospace engineer

Fictional characters
Kruge (Star Trek), Klingon commander in Star Trek III: The Search for Spock
Mrs Kruge in Roarin' Dan, 1920 short film

See also
Kruge (disambiguation)